The portrayal of Indigenous people of the Americas in popular culture has oscillated between the fascination with the noble savage who lives in harmony with nature, and the stereotype of the uncivilized Red Indian of the traditional Western genre. The common depiction of Indigenous Americans and their relationship with European colonists has changed over time. Today indigenous Americans are fully modern peoples who retain much of their cultural beliefs and traditional practices.

History

In 1851, Charles Dickens wrote a scathingly sarcastic review in his weekly magazine, Household Words, of painter George Catlin's show of American Indians when it visited England. In his essay, entitled The Noble Savage, Dickens expressed repugnance for Indians and their way of life, recommending that they ought to be "civilized out of existence". (Dickens' essay refers to Dryden's use of the term, not to Rousseau.) Dickens' scorn for those unnamed individuals, who, like Catlin, he alleged, misguidedly exalted the so-called "noble savage", was limitless. In reality, Dickens maintained, Indians were dirty, cruel, and constantly fighting among themselves. Dickens' satire on Catlin and others like him who might find something to admire in the American Indians or African bushmen is a notable turning point in the history of the use of the phrase.

Eastern European-produced Westerns were popular in Communist Eastern European countries, and were a particular favorite of Joseph Stalin.  "Red Western" or "Ostern" films usually portrayed the American Indians sympathetically, as oppressed people fighting for their rights, in contrast to American Westerns of the time, which frequently portrayed the Indians as villains.

The concept of Native Americans living in harmony with nature was taken up in the 1960s by the hippie subculture and played a certain role in the formative phase of the environmentalist movement. The so-called Legend of the Rainbow Warriors, an alleged Hopi prophecy foretelling environmental activism, became popular, with most proponents unaware that the story is untrue, written as part of an evangelical Christian tract, and an attempt to destroy traditional Native religions.

In the US cultural mainstream, negative depiction of Native Americans came to be seen as racist in the 1980s, as reflected in the production of western films emphasizing the "noble savage" such as Dances with Wolves (1990).

Comics
Native American characters in comic books and comic strips include Akwas, a comic strip about Native Americans created by Mike Roy, and Super-Chief, an Indian superhero created for DC Comics. In the 1990s, DC Comics superhero Hawkman (Katar Hol) was depicted as being the son of a Thanagarian man and a Native American woman named Naomi Carter.

Marvel Comics features many Native American superheroes including Thunderbird (John Proudstar), Warpath, Shaman, Talisman, Forge, Danielle Moonstar and Echo.

Italian comic books featuring Tex Willer prominently feature Native Americans in their pilota, starring from the first story, "Il totem misterioso".

European comics of the mid 20th century usually ridiculed Indians as goofy comedic characters. Examples include Little Plum, Oumpah-pah and Big Chief Keen-Eyed Mole.

Music
Since the turn of the century,  stereotypical "heroic Indian braves" and their "devoted squaws" have been the subject of popular songs by non-Natives. Early examples include "Red Wing" and "Cherokee Maiden" by Bob Wills. Other songs with these stereotypes include "Running Bear" by the Big Bopper, "Apache" by the Shadows, and "Wig Wam Bam" by the Sweet.

In contrast, Native American and First Nations artists have released their own songs about their people, ancestors and experiences. These include "Soldier Blue" by Buffy St Marie, "Wovoka" by Redbone, "The Land is Your Mother" by Floyd Red Crow Westerman and "Oil 4 Blood" by so basically Frank Waln, among many others. 

Since the 1980s, songs by non-native musicians have drawn upon literature written by Native Americans to condemn the injustices committed by white people. Examples include "Run to the Hills" by Iron Maiden and "Creek Mary's Blood" by Nightwish which includes vocals from Native American musician John Two-Hawks.

Film

In films such as Northwest Passage (1940), Native Americans are the villains, attacking White settlers, often at the instigation of unscrupulous White men.  But there are many Hollywood films that offer a more sympathetic picture.  Most of the John Ford Westerns show respect toward American Indians, and they are the heroes of such major films as Broken Arrow (1950) and Dances With Wolves (1990).  Probably the most famous "Indian" in American popular media is the Lone Ranger's sidekick, Tonto, most famously portrayed by Native American actor Jay Silverheels.

Literature
Native Americans assumed a central role in American literary themes between the 1820s and 1830s. In this period, they were often portrayed by white authors as the soon-to-be extinct originators of an American nationhood that is to be assumed by white Americans. The Indigenous identity was often presented as something that can be used by white Americans to distinguish themselves from the British, as in the Fraternal Order of Red Men or the Sons of Liberty at the Boston Tea Party. Other works in what scholars call the "Indian hater" genre glorified white frontier settlers on genocidal rampages and provided literary justification for Indian removal policy of the period. Some white authors in this period like John Neal challenged these trends. His novel Logan (1822) challenged racial boundaries between white and Native Americans. His short story "David Whicher" (1832) reacted to the Indian Removal Act (1830) and popular literature that supported it by exploring peaceful multiethnic coexistence in the US.

Rick, the protagonist of Simon Spurrier's novel, The Culled (2006, book 1 of The Afterblight Chronicles), belongs to the Haudenosaunee people and is guided through crises by the sachem. Another character, named Hiawatha, saves Rick's life and advises him the Tadodaho have said Rick and Hiawatha are aligned.

Throughout Sherman Alexie's poem, "How to Write the Great American Indian Novel" he states that all of the Indians must have tragic noses, eyes, and arms. Their hands and fingers must be tragic when they reach for tragic food. Natives are portrayed with tragic features because it resembles their tragic history. "The hero must be a half-breed, half white and half Indian, preferably from a horse culture. He should often weep alone. That is mandatory". Males are depicted as being the strong warriors. Males are also often depicted as wearing headdresses in popular culture. "If the hero is an Indian women, she is beautiful. She must be slender and in love with a white man". In popular culture women are depicted in a sexualized form. Women are depicted as not portraying strength. However, Native American women are very strong. They picked berries and looked after the kids.

In  Vine DeLoria's story, "Indian Humor" he states that "It has always been a great disappointment to Indian People that the humorous side of Indian life has not been mentioned by professed experts on Indian affairs". Native Americans are seen as always being serious and warriors. However, Native Americans are humorous and have a completely different side to them than most people think. Native Americans can be serious and warriors but they can also be humorous and comforting. Native Americans actually use humor to joke about their brutal history. It is their way of coping. The fact that they are willing to allow humor to joke around about their past and the killing of thousands of Native Americans proves that they are not savages. Instead, they are casual everyday people

Video games
A Lakota-Sioux warrior named Nightwolf debuted in the video game Mortal Kombat 3 (1995) and has been a recurring protagonist of the franchise. He is one of the few mortals who are spiritually aware, acting as a historian and shaman of his people.

In American Conquest (2003), various native tribes and empires during the colonisation of the Americas by Europeans are depicted.

In Red Dead Revolver (2004), the protagonist Red Harlow is half Native American on his mother's side.

In Age of Empires III (2005), several native tribes featured in the game, three of these tribes were made playable in the expansion pack Age of Empires III: The WarChiefs.

In Gun (2005), the protagonist, Cole White, is revealed to be an Apache who was adopted as a baby by his stepfather Ned after the rest of his tribe was massacred.

In Prey (2006), the protagonist, Tommy, is a mechanic of Cherokee heritage, who is sick of life on the reservation and resents his heritage. In the beginning of the game, after a bar fight, the building is lifted up by a hostile alien ship, and he and his family are abducted. As the game progresses, he must fight to escape.

The Honest Hearts DLC for Fallout New Vegas (2010) features three Native American tribes in a post-apocalyptic Zion National Park, Utah: the peaceful Sorrows and the courageous Dead Horses versus the cruel White Legs.

In Red Dead Redemption (2010), disaffected Native Americans form most of a gang led by Dutch Van Der Linde, a major antagonist of the game. A Native American called Nastas aids the protagonist John Marston in stopping the gang because while he shares their resentment for the government's treatment of natives he does not agree with fighting for Dutch nor his tactics. The prequel Red Dead Redemption 2 also features Native Americans in a more prominent role in the form of Wapiti Indians led by Rains Fall and including members such as his son Eagle Flies. Additionally a Van der Linde gang member and major character in the game Charles Smith is a half-Native American and later joins the Indians for sometime after he leaves Dutch and the gang due to the latter's deteriorating state.

In Assassin's Creed III (2012), set during the American Revolution, the protagonist is a half English, half Mohawk Native American named Ratonhnhaké:ton.

In Grand Theft Auto V (2013), protagonist Franklin Clinton's best friend Lamar Davis claims to be of Apache descent.

In Infamous: Second Son (2014), the protagonist Delsin Rowe and his brother Reggie are members of a fictional Native American tribe called the Akomish.

In Assassin's Creed: Rogue (2014), an Abenaki Assassin named Kesegowaase is a minor antagonist, the protagonist Shay Cormac also encounters members of the Oneida tribe.

See also 
 List of fictional Native Americans
 Native Americans in German popular culture

 Show Indians

 Great Spirit
 Native American warrior
 Native Americans in children's literature
 Portrayal of Native Americans in film
Native American hobbyism in Germany

References

 
United States in popular culture